The Chilean ambassador in Tel Aviv is the official representative of the Government in Santiago de Chile to the Government of Israel.

List of representatives

References 

 
Israel
Chile